Teresa Bogusławska (13 July 1929 - 1 February 1945) was a Polish poet and a participant in the Warsaw Uprising. In 1941 she joined the resistance movement. In February 1944 was arrested by the Gestapo, imprisoned in the Pawiak prison and tortured during questioning. She was freed in March suffering from tuberculosis. Her health never recovered. During the Warsaw Uprising, she helped by sewing uniforms and bands for insurgents. She died in 1945, aged 16, from meningitis.

References 

1929 births
1945 deaths
Home Army members
Warsaw Uprising insurgents
20th-century Polish poets
Neurological disease deaths in Poland
Deaths from meningitis
Polish civilians killed in World War II
Women in World War II